Alphacrambus parvus is a species of moth in the family Crambidae in the genus Alphacrambus. It was described by Graziano Bassi in 1995 and is known from the Democratic Republic of the Congo.

References

Moths described in 1995
Crambini
Moths of Africa